Wilhelm Müller (1794–1827) was a German lyric poet

Wilhelm Müller may also refer to

Wilhelm Max Müller (1862–1919), American orientalist, grandson of the poet
Wilhelm Müller (handballer) (1909–1984), German handballer
Wilhelm Müller (physicist) (1880–1968), German physicist
Wilhelm Müller (rower), Swiss rower